Kevin Guy (born December 6, 1972) is an arena football coach and former wide receiver and defensive back who is the head coach for the Arizona Rattlers of the Indoor Football League (IFL). He played his college football at the University of West Alabama, and was an AFL wide receiver and defensive back from 1996 to 1999. He has been a football coach since 2000, and first served as a head coach in 2000 as the interim head coach for the New Jersey Red Dogs. After being the defensive coordinator for the San Jose SaberCats from 2006 to 2007, he became the Rattlers head coach in 2008.  In 2018, his wife Cathy became co-owner of a new Tucson-based IFL franchise, called the Tucson Sugar Skulls, set to play in 2019.

Early life
Born in Birmingham, Alabama, Guy grew up in Alabama then continued his high school career in Shelby County High School in Columbiana, Alabama, where he was a member of the Wildcats football team from 1987 to 1990. Kevin then enrolled at University of West Alabama, and played wide receiver before finishing his career as a defensive back on the West Alabama Tigers football team from 1991 to 1995.

College career
Guy was tested by many high level programs, taking visits to Alabama, Auburn, Mississippi State, Samford and Chattanooga, but only received a scholarship from West Alabama.

Professional career
The Minnesota Fighting Pike signed Guy after he went unselected in the 1996 NFL Draft. He played four years as a wide receiver and defensive back in the AFL, with Minnesota in 1996, the New Jersey Red Dogs from 1997 to 1999, and the Orlando Predators in 1999. He first became a regular starting defensive back in 1996 with Minnesota. In 1998 with New Jersey, he helped lead the Red Dogs to the AFL Semifinal.

Coaching career

In 2000, while not even being one year removed from the AFL, Guy was a defensive coordinator for the Red Dogs under head coach Frank Mattiace. With four games left in the 2000 season, the Red Dogs fired Mattiace, and Guy served the teams interim head coach for the remainder of the season. In 2001, he returned to the AFL as a defensive coordinator for the Florida Bobcats. He then became a head coach at the af2 level, starting in 2002 with the Tennessee Valley Vipers. After coaching Tennessee to three consecutive playoff berths 2002, 2003 and 2004, he moved to the Rio Grande Valley Dorados, and served as head coach during the 2005 season and led the Dorados to the National Conference Championship game. After the 2005 season, Guy was named the defensive coordinator for the San Jose SaberCats of the AFL. Guy's defensive squad helped lead the SaberCats to back-to-back American Conference Championship Game appearances, and a berth in ArenaBowl XXI, where the SaberCats would defeat the Chicago Rush. Following the SaberCats ArenaBowl victory, the Arizona Rattlers named Guy their 4th head coach in franchise history. Guy led the team to playoff appearances in his first five seasons there, making four consecutive appearances in the ArenaBowl, winning ArenaBowl XXV and ArenaBowl XXVI both over the Philadelphia Soul, and winning ArenaBowl XXVII over the Cleveland Gladiators.

In September 2005, Guy was named the defensive coordinator of the San Jose SaberCats of the AFL.

Guy was named the head coach of the Arizona Rattlers in August 2007.

On September 15, 2020, it was announced Guy would be assuming the role of Arizona Rattlers team president in addition to his head coaching and general manager duties.

Head coaching record

See also

 List of professional gridiron football coaches with 200 wins

References

External links
 Official website

1972 births
Living people
Sportspeople from Birmingham, Alabama
Players of American football from Birmingham, Alabama
American football wide receivers
American football defensive backs
Minnesota Fighting Pike players
New Jersey Red Dogs players
West Alabama Tigers football players
Arizona Rattlers coaches
People from Columbiana, Alabama
Alabama Vipers coaches
Cleveland Gladiators coaches
Florida Bobcats coaches
Rio Grande Valley Dorados coaches
San Jose SaberCats coaches